The 2004 Ju-Jitsu World Championship were the 6th edition of the Ju-Jitsu World Championships, and were held in Móstoles, Spain from November 26 to November 28, 2004.

Schedule 
26.11.2004 – Men's and Women's Fighting System, Men's Duo System – Classic
27.11.2004 – Men's and Women's Fighting System, Women's Duo System – Classic
28.11.2004 – Men's and Women's Fighting System, Mixed Duo System – Classic

European Ju-Jitsu

Fighting System

Men's events

Women's events

Duo System

Duo Classic events

Links

References

External links
 TOP3 results from JJIF site (PDF)
TOP6 results from JJIF site (PDF)